Werner Stocker (born 14 August 1961) is a Swiss bobsledder who competed in the late 1980s. He won a gold medal in the four-man event with his teammates Ekkehard Fasser, Kurt Meier and Marcel Fässler at the 1988 Winter Olympics in Calgary, Alberta, Canada.

References
Bobsleigh four-man Olympic medalists for 1924, 1932-56, and since 1964
DatabaseOlympics.com profile

1961 births
Bobsledders at the 1988 Winter Olympics
Living people
Olympic bobsledders of Switzerland
Olympic gold medalists for Switzerland
Swiss male bobsledders
Olympic medalists in bobsleigh
Medalists at the 1988 Winter Olympics
20th-century Swiss people